Small Child Fountain, also known as Baby Fountain, is a fountain and sculpture by Mary E. Moore, installed in Boston's Public Garden, in the U.S. state of Massachusetts. The fountain features a bronze sculpture of a nude boy, cast in 1929, that measure approximately 2 ft. 4 in. x 21 in. x 17 in. It rests on a granite base. The work was surveyed as part of the Smithsonian Institution's "Save Outdoor Sculpture!" program in 1993.

References

External links

 

1929 establishments in Massachusetts
1929 sculptures
Boston Public Garden
Bronze sculptures in Massachusetts
Fountains in Massachusetts
Granite sculptures in Massachusetts
Nude sculptures in the United States
Outdoor sculptures in Boston
Sculptures of children in the United States
Statues in Boston